Albert T. Colburn was a member of the Wisconsin State Assembly.

Biography
Colburn was born on August 9, 1816, in Springwater, New York. He was a miller by trade.

Political career
Colburn was a member of the Assembly during the 1876 session. Other positions he held include Chairman of the county board of Monroe County, Wisconsin. He was a Republican.

References

People from Livingston County, New York
People from Jefferson County, Wisconsin
People from Monroe County, Wisconsin
Republican Party members of the Wisconsin State Assembly
Millers
1816 births
Year of death missing